Lasu Pata (local Quechua lasu (rasu) snow, ice, mountain with snow, pata step, bank of a river, also spelled Lazopata) is a mountain in Peru, about  high. It is located in the Junín Region, Concepción Province, Andamarca District.

References

Mountains of Peru
Mountains of Junín Region